The California Mail is a 1929 American silent Western film directed by Albert S. Rogell and written by Marion Jackson and Leslie Mason. The film stars Ken Maynard, Dorothy Dwan, Lafe McKee, Paul Hurst, C.E. Anderson and Fred Burns. The film was released on April 7, 1929, by First National Pictures.

Cast   
 Ken Maynard as Bob Scott
 Dorothy Dwan as Molly Butler
 Lafe McKee as William Butler
 Paul Hurst as Rowdy Ryan
 C.E. Anderson as Butch McGraw
 Fred Burns as John Harrison 
 Tarzan as Tarzan

References

External links
 

1929 films
1920s English-language films
1929 Western (genre) films
First National Pictures films
Films directed by Albert S. Rogell
American black-and-white films
Silent American Western (genre) films
1920s American films